Werrington railway station is located on the Main Western line, serving the Sydney suburb of Werrington. It is served by Sydney Trains T1 Western line services.

History
Werrington station opened on 2 May 1868 as a private platform on the Main Western line for Henry Parkes named Parkes Platform. It opened for public use in 1878 and was renamed Werrington on 25 March 1893.

In June 2008, the station was upgraded with a new footbridge and lifts. It was fitted with solar panels at the same time, being the first CityRail station fitted. An upgrade to the commuter car park was completed in June 2010.

On 18 August 2011 a boy was hit by an express heading to city after dangerously crossing the tracks. The boy's leg and elbow were broken as well as sustaining serious injury. Transit officers arrived soon to call emergency services. The boy was then transported to the Royal Alexandra Hospital for Children for treatment. It was revealed that the boy had survived by hiding in the 'lip' of the platform where the train had injured but not killed him.

The main array of 42 solar panels (7.35 kW capacity) appears to be no longer working since late 2012. As of August 2014, the system has not been repaired and no plans to fix it have been announced.

Platforms and services

Transport links
Busways operates two routes via Werrington station:
782: Penrith station to St Marys station
785: to Penrith station

Werrington is served by one NightRide route approximately one kilometre from Werrington station on the Great Western Highway:
N70: Penrith station to Town Hall station

Western Sydney University runs a free Shuttle Bus every 10 minutes from the station to the Werrington North and South Campus.

References

External links

Werrington station details Transport for New South Wales

Railway stations in Australia opened in 1868
Easy Access railway stations in Sydney
Main Western railway line, New South Wales
Railway stations in Sydney
Werrington, New South Wales